Two ships of the Royal Navy were named HMS Clacton

, an auxiliary minesweeper torpedoed and sunk in 1917
, a  launched in 1941 and sunk in 1943

Royal Navy ship names